Horsted Keynes railway station is a preserved railway station on the Bluebell Railway in Sussex. The station has been used as a shooting location in several film and TV productions.

History

The station was closed by British Railways under the Beeching Axe on 28 October 1963 with the cessation of trains from Seaford via Haywards Heath (trains over the Lewes to East Grinstead line having ceased in 1958). However, the first Bluebell Railway trains had run on the last day of the 1962 season using the disused eastern side (electrified services only used Platform 2).

As a junction station it was the busiest station on the line in terms of services but arguably one of the quieter for passengers.

Since being taken over by the Bluebell Railway, the station has become one of the most popular in UK preservation, and has won many awards. It has been restored with a 1930s theme, including period newspaper headlines on boards by the buffet, and advertisements of the period. With five platforms, it is the largest preserved heritage railway station in the UK. Horsted Keynes is the crossing place for services when two trains are operating, and hosts many events each year for steam enthusiasts. It is also the home of the line's Carriage and Wagon department.

Repair and restoration work on the canopy on Platform 5 began in late 2022, as part of the "Jewel in the Crown" project to refurbish the station buildings, financed by a fund-raising campaign which had accumulated £543,000 by the start of 2022. 

The Bluebell Railway plans to make the station a junction once again if plans to extend toward Ardingly are realised, creating something rare within UK preservation, a junction station at which both lines are operated by preservationists.

Listed buildings
The main station building, the signal box, and an engine house to the south of the station, are all Grade II Listed buildings. All three were originally built in or shortly after 1882, to the designs of Thomas Myres, the railway company's staff architect.

The railway has been featured in many television series and films, including Downton Abbey, Poirot and The Woman In Black.

See also
 List of closed railway stations in Britain

References

External links

 Horsted Keynes railway station on Trainspot

Heritage railway stations in West Sussex
Former London, Brighton and South Coast Railway stations
Railway stations in Great Britain opened in 1882
Bluebell Railway
Grade II listed buildings in West Sussex
Thomas Myres buildings